The Kenya national cricket team is the team that represents the country of Kenya in international cricket matches. Kenya was part of the East Africa cricket team which became an associate member of the ICC in 1966, and competed in the first World Cup. Kenya first competed as an independent nation at the 1996 Cricket World Cup, after which they were given full ODI status, which they held until 2014, when they finished fifth in the 2014 Cricket World Cup Qualifier. Kenya's best performance at the Cricket World Cup was in 2003, where they reached the semi-finals.

Cricket World Cup Record

White: Group/Round-Robin Stage

World Cup Record (By Team)

1996 World Cup

1996 was Kenya's debut at the Cricket World Cup, and they were drawn against co-hosts Sri Lanka, and also Australia, India, West Indies and Zimbabwe. Kenya beat the West Indies, but lost their other 4 games, and were eliminated after the Group Stages.

1999 World Cup

In the 1999 World Cup itself, they were placed in the same first round group as hosts England, and India, South Africa, Sri Lanka and Zimbabwe. They lost all five of their games in the tournament.

2003 World Cup

The 2003 Cricket World Cup was to be Kenya's finest moment in international cricket to date. The tournament was to be held in South Africa, with Kenya hosting their two matches against Sri Lanka and New Zealand.

Group stage

The tournament started with a defeat to South Africa, but Kenya bounced back with a four wicket win over Canada in Cape Town. New Zealand forfeited their match against Kenya in Nairobi due to safety concerns, but Sri Lanka did visit Nairobi and lost by 53 runs. The tournament continued, back in South Africa, with a win over Bangladesh and a defeat to the West Indies. Kenya had done enough to qualify for the Super Six stage, becoming the first non-test nation to progress beyond the first round of the World Cup.

Super 6 Stage
In the Super Six stage, they lost to India and Australia, but beat Zimbabwe by seven wickets, qualifying for the semi-final.

Semi-final stage
In the Semi-Final, Kenya lost to India by 91 runs.

The fairytale ended for the Kenyan team, the only non-Test-playing nation to ever make a World Cup semi-final. Sachin Tendulkar (83 from 101 balls, 5 fours, 1 six) and Sourav Ganguly (111 from 114 balls, 5 fours, 5 sixes), batted the Kenyans out of the game as India careered to a total of 270 (4 wickets, 50 overs). Under the Durban lights, the potent Indian seam attack of Zaheer Khan (3/14 in 9.2 overs), the experienced Javagal Srinath (1/11 in 7 overs) and Ashish Nehra (2/11 in 5 overs) careered through the Kenyan top order. Kenya were bowled out for 179 (all out, 46.2 overs), with only Steve Tikolo (56 from 83 balls, 5 fours, 2 sixes) putting up any significant resistance.

2007 World Cup

Kenya hosted Division One of the World Cricket League at three grounds in Nairobi, playing against Bermuda, Canada, Ireland, the Netherlands and Scotland. Kenya also won this event, beating Scotland in the final. This was followed by the 2007 World Cup, Kenya's fourth World Cup. Kenya beat Canada in the first round, but lost to England and New Zealand, thus missing out on the Super Eight stage.

Kenya captain Steve Tikolo was named man of the match after playing all the way through the chase, coming in at 52 for two, with David Obuya and Ravindu Shah dismissed in single figures with a strike rate below 25. Nevertheless, only Canada's captain John Davison conceded less than 3.5 runs an over, as the three first Canadian bowlers, Umar Bhatti, Anderson Cummins and Henry Osinde conceded 16 wides among the 107 runs in 22.2 overs. The Kenyan spinners, on the other hand, took five for 78 from 29 overs, "strangling the scoring rate." Cummins became the second man to play World Cup cricket for two different countries, having represented West Indies in 1992.

Ed Joyce's second fifty in as many matches helped England qualify for the Super Eights in what was essentially a play-off match, eliminating 2003 semi-finalists Kenya. Steve Tikolo came in at four after James Anderson had removed both openers, and though he made his 20th half-century, none of his team-mates passed 20. Extras were the second-highest contributor, with six wides and eight no-balls, most of the latter coming from Sajid Mahmood and Andrew Flintoff, who bowled three no-balls each. Flintoff did get Tikolo out with a yorker, while three of Kenya's players were run out as they were bowled out on the last ball of the rain-reduced innings.

Kenya's opening bowler Peter Ongondo extracted "tennis-ball bounce" to remove Michael Vaughan for one with the 19th ball of the game; however, despite Ian Bell getting caught for 16, England had reduced the equation to 126 off 34.2 overs after Joyce and Bell's partnership. With Kevin Pietersen also getting a fifty, England made it through with ten overs to spare.

2011 World Cup

Kenya qualified for the 2011 Cricket World Cup, but failed to win a single match, being eliminated in the Group Stages.

The first match of Group A saw Kenya taking on the New Zealanders. Kenya won the toss and elected to bat first on a pitch which seemed to have a lot of runs. However, the New Zealanders started very well, restricting the Kenyans for runs throughout the first 6 overs. The pressure paid off as Tim Southee trapped Alex Obanda in front with the score at 16 after 7 overs. Fellow opener Seren Waters and Collins Obuya tried to rebuild but Hamish Bennett came into the attack and got Waters lbw to make the score 40/2. Bennett then ripped through the Kenyan batting and got 3 more wickets in double-quick time to reduce the Kenyans to 49/5. The shattered Kenyans then folded, with only Rakep Patel offering resistance with 16 not out as Southee and Jacob Oram finished off the tail to get Kenya all out for 69 in 23.5 overs.

The New Zealand openers started off quickly in their small chase, with Martin Guptill doing most of the early scoring. Brendon McCullum was bowled off a free hit but got into his stride and finished off the game with two successive boundaries, as New Zealand reached their target in just eight overs without losing any wicket, to complete a ten-wicket win.

Pakistan, who were on a poor run of form before this World Cup faced off against Kenya. Pakistan captain Shahid Afridi won the toss and elected to bat first but it was the Kenyan bowlers who struck early, getting opens Mohammad Hafeez and Ahmed Shehzad out early on, leaving Pakistan at 12/2 at the end of 7 overs. Kamran Akmal and Younis Khan then began a rebuilding partnership of 98, until Kamran fell shortly after reaching his half-century. Younis also reached a half-century and fell immediately, before Misbah-ul-Haq and Umar Akmal hit a rapid 118-run partnership, with the latter especially being severe on the bowlers in his 71 off 52 balls. Both men fell towards the end of the innings as Pakistan reached 317/7, helped quite substantially by the Kenyan bowling which conceded 46 extras.

Kenya started off solidly in their big chase, with openers Morris Ouma and Seren Waters adding 37 for the first wicket until a direct hit from Umar Akmal had the latter run out. The Kenyans fought during the first half of their innings, getting to 73/2 before Shahid Afridi bowled Steve Tikolo. He then ran through the lower middle order and the tail with ease, and ended up with figures of 5/16 from 8 overs as Kenya collapsed to 112 all out, with the only resistance offered by Collins Obuya's 47.

Afridi took the best figures for a Pakistan bowler in the World Cup, with 5/16. Kenya bowled 37 wides, equaling the record set by the West Indies, also against Pakistan, in 1989.

Sri Lankan fast bowler Lasith Malinga took a hat-trick, the second in his career. He became the first bowler to take two World Cup hat-tricks, and the fourth bowler to take two career ODI hat-tricks.

Canada's win was their third-successive victory against Kenya and their second win in World Cup matches. They had previously beaten Bangladesh in the 2003 Cricket World Cup.

Kenya's total of 264 is their highest score in World Cup matches, beating their previous best of 254 against Sri Lanka in the 1996 Cricket World Cup.

See also
Kenya national cricket team
Cricket in Kenya

Notes

References

Cricket in Kenya
Kenya in international cricket
History of the Cricket World Cup